Loop is an unincorporated community and census-designated place in Gaines County, Texas, United States. As of the 2010 census it had a population of 225.

The community was named for the loop of the postmaster's lasso.

Geography
Loop is located in northeastern Gaines County along Texas State Highway 83, which leads west  to Seagraves and east  to Welch.

Education
The Loop Independent School District serves area students. The campus includes all grades from Kindergarten to Senior level. All students are contained on the single campus with a circular building for the primary school and with high school and middle school students sharing a long rectangular hallway.

The school participates in the Texas University Interscholastic League. The school's mascot is the Loop Longhorn.  The school participates in sports including Six-man football, volleyball, basketball, tennis, and track.  The school also has maintained a marching band and concert band program.

References

Unincorporated communities in Texas
Census-designated places in Gaines County, Texas
Census-designated places in Texas
Unincorporated communities in Gaines County, Texas